Dulab (also Romanized as Dūlāb; also known as Bandar-e Dūlāb) is a village in Dulab Rural District, Shahab District, Qeshm County, Hormozgan Province, Iran. At the 2006 census, its population was 1,125, in 243 families.

References 

Populated places in Qeshm County